West Virginia Route 104 is an east–west state highway located in the Princeton, West Virginia area. The western terminus of the route is at West Virginia Route 20 west of downtown. The eastern terminus is at U.S. Route 460 on the eastern outskirts of Princeton a half-mile west of the West Virginia Turnpike. The portion along Oakvale Road, east of the intersection with WV 20, is a former alignment of US 460 before Corridor Q was built.

Major intersections

References

104
Transportation in Mercer County, West Virginia